The Integrated Child Protection Scheme (ICPS) is a governmental program implemented by the Government Of India to help secure the safety of children, with a special emphasis on children in need of care and protection, juveniles in conflict or contact with the law and other vulnerable children. Its primary purpose is to create a central structure to provide oversight and standardization for pre-existing and evolving child protection schemes in India.  Proposed in 2006 and implemented in 2009, the ICPS is administered at the state level by state child protection committees and societies and at the district level by district child protection societies, among other institutions.

Structures
Government of India Level
 Ministry of Women and Child Development (India)
 Central Adoption Resource Authority
 Central Project Support Unit
 National Institute of Public Cooperation and Child Development
 childline 1098 services

State Government Level

 State Child Protection Society
 State Adoption & Resource Agency
 State Project Support Unit
 State Adoption Recommendation Committee

 District Level

 District Child Protection Unit
 Child Welfare Committee
 Juvenile Justice Board
 Special Juvenile Police Unit
 Sponsorship Foster Care Approval Committee
 District Inspection Committee

Sub-District Level

 Block Level Child Protection Committee
 Village Level Child Protection Committee

See also
Odisha State Child Protection Society

References
 https://web.archive.org/web/20150119144100/http://wcd.nic.in/icpsmon/home.aspx

Further reading

Government schemes in India
Child welfare in India